"Addison Rae" is a song by Australian rapper the Kid Laroi, a song named after the social media personality  of the same name. It was released on 22 March 2020 and peaked at number 76 on the ARIA charts. The song has been certified gold in Australia.

Charts

Certifications

References

2020 singles
2020 songs
The Kid Laroi songs
Songs written by the Kid Laroi
Songs about entertainers